Pyrausta cardinalis is a moth in the family Crambidae. It was described by Achille Guenée in 1854. It is found in Florida, Cuba, the Dominican Republic and on the Virgin Islands and Puerto Rico.

The wingspan is about 12 mm. Adults have been recorded on wing in March in Florida.

References

Moths described in 1854
cardinalis
Moths of North America